Union Mills is an unincorporated community in Pleasants County, West Virginia, United States. The community is located along McKim Creek at its confluence with Middle Island Creek.

References 

Unincorporated communities in West Virginia
Unincorporated communities in Pleasants County, West Virginia